Calothamnus quadrifidus subsp. teretifolius is a plant in the myrtle family, Myrtaceae and is endemic to the south-west of Western Australia.  It is similar to other subspecies of Calothamnus quadrifidus except that its leaves are glabrous and cylindrical. (Subspecies quadrifidus also has cylindrical leaves but they often have a covering of long, silky hairs.)

Description

The flowers are red and are arranged in clusters, usually on one side of the stem amongst the older leaves.

Taxonomy and naming
Calothamnus quadrifidus subsp. teretifolius was first formally described in 2010 by Alex George in Nuytsia from a specimen collected west of the Whicher Scarp. The epithet teretifolius is "from the Latin teres (terete) and folium (a leaf).

Distribution and habitat
Calothamnus quadrifidus subsp. teretifolius is found inland from Busselton in the Jarrah Forest and Swan Coastal Plain biogeographic regions. It grows in clay in winter-west areas in shrubland.

Conservation
Calothamnus quadrifidus subsp. teretifolius is classified as "Priority Four" by the Western Australian Government Department of Parks and Wildlife meaning that it is rare or near threatened.

References

quadrifidus subsp. teretifolius
Myrtales of Australia
Plants described in 2010
Plant subspecies